Christian originated as a baptismal name used by persons of the Christian religion. It is now a given name borne by males, and by females as Christiana and other feminized variants. The name denotes a follower of Jesus Christ, thus a Christian. It has been used as a given name since the Middle Ages, originally a male given name. It was later used for females, without any feminising word endings.

Today, the name is popular in the United States, the United Kingdom, Ireland, Canada, Australia, New Zealand, South Africa, France, Italy, the Netherlands, Belgium, Switzerland, Germany, Austria, Hungary, Norway, Sweden, Finland, Romania, Denmark, Iceland, Estonia, Bulgaria and the Philippines. In Europe, it is almost exclusively used as a male name, but in the 17th and 18th centuries, it was a popular female first name in Scotland.

Female variants of the name include Christine, Christina, Christiane, Cristiane, Kristen, Cristina, Kristin, and Kirsten.  Holders of the name Christina may go by the nicknames or shortened forms Chris, Chrissy, Tina, or Xian.

In other languages
 Christianus (Latin)
 Chrétien (French)
 Christian (Danish, German, Norwegian, French, Swedish)
 Christiaan (Afrikaans, Dutch)
 Karsten (Low German, Dutch)
 קריסטלעך (Qrystlʻk) (Yiddish)
 נוצרי (Hebrew)
 Crisdean (Gaelic)
 Creestee (Manx)
 Cristiano (Italian and Portuguese)
 Cristian or Cristián (Spanish, Romanian; Romance languages)
 Kristián (Czech, Slovak)
 Kristian (Estonian, Finnish, Danish, Norwegian, Croatian or Swedish, Breton)
 Kristjan (Estonian, Faroese, Slovenian)
 Kristian, Kristi, Kristo (Albanian)
 Kristján (Icelandic)
 Kristijan (Croatian)
 Kristian (Malaysian)
 Kristiāns, Krišjānis, Krišs (Latvian)
 Kristijonas (Lithuanian)
 Krystian (Polish)
 Krisztián, Keresztény, for the Danish kings Keresztély (Hungarian)
 Χριστιανός, Christianós (Greek)
 Кристиан (Russian)
 Християн (Ukrainian)
 Христиан (Serbian)
 Кристијан, Kristijan or Христијан, Hristijan (Macedonian)
 Християн, Христиан, Кристиян or Кристиан (Bulgarian)
 քրիստոնյա (Armenian)
 كريستيان (Arabic)
 مسیحی (Persian)
 عیسائی (Urdu)
 খ্রীষ্টান (Khrishtan) (Bengali)
 ক্রিস্টান (Krishtan) (Sylheti)
 ईसाई (Īsā'ī) (Hindi)
 ख्रीष्टियन (Khrīṣṭiyana) (Nepali)
 ਮਸੀਹੀ (Masīhī) (Punjabi)
 ಕ್ರಿಶ್ಚಿಯನ್ (Kriściyan) (Kannada)
 క్రిస్టియన్(Krisṭiyan) (Telugu)
 கிரிஸ்துவர் (Kiristuvar) (Tamil)
 คริสเตียน (Khris̄teīyn) (Thai)
 克里斯蒂安 (Kèlǐsīdìān) (Chinese Simplified)
  (Kèlǐsīdìān) (Chinese Traditional)
 クリスチャン (Kurisuchan) (Japanese)
 크리스천 (Keuliseucheon) (Korean)
 Karaitiana (Maori)
 ක්‍රිස්තියානි (Kristiyani) (Sinhala)

Characters
 Christian, protagonist of The Pilgrim's Progress by John Bunyan
 Baron Christian de Neuvillette, a character in the play Cyrano de Bergerac by Edmond Rostand
Christian Cage (born 1973), ring name of professional wrestler and actor Jay Reso
Christian Clarke, a character in the British soap opera EastEnders
Christian Shephard, a character on the ABC series Lost
Christian Troy, a character on the FX original series Nip/Tuck
 Christian, a character in Diana Wynne Jones' fantasy novel Black Maria
Christian Grey, a character from E. L. James novel 50 Shades of Grey
 Christian, a character in the movie Moulin Rouge!

Males with the given name Christian
 Saint Christian of Cologne, died AD 1002, abbot of St-Pantaleon in Cologne (Germany)
 Saint Christian of Clogher, died AD 1138, bishop of Clogher (Ireland) and brother of St. Malachy
 Several kings of Denmark
 Several princes
Christian of Oliva, 13th century Cistercian monk, first bishop of Prussia
Christiaan Huygens, Dutch astronomer, physicist, mathematician and inventor
Christian IX of Denmark (1818–1906), King of Denmark (1863–1906)
Christian X of Denmark (1870–1947), King of Denmark (1912–1947) and Iceland (1918–1944)
Christian Abbiati (born 1977), Italian footballer
Christian Alexander (born 1990), American actor
Christian Annan (born 1978), former Ghanaian-born Hong Kong professional footballer
Christian Augustus, Count Palatine of Sulzbach (1622–1708), German ruler
Christian Atsu (1992–c. 2023), Ghanaian professional footballer
Christian Bables (born 1992), Filipino actor
Christian Baciotti, French musician
Christian Bakkerud (1984–2011), Danish racing driver
Christian Bale (born 1974), English actor
Christian Barmore (born 1999), American football player
Christian Bauman (born 1970), American writer
Christian Bautista (born 1981), Filipino singer
Christian Benford (born 2000), American football player
Christian Benteke (born 1990), Belgian footballer
Christian Bergman (born 1988), American baseball player
Christian Bethancourt (born 1991), Panamanian baseball player
Christian Biet (1952–2020), French theatrical scholar
Christian Bizot (1928–2002), French winemaker, head of the Bollinger Champagne house
Christian Bonaud (1957–2019), French Islamologist
Christian Boros (born 1964), German advertising agency founder and art collector
Christian Braun (born 2001), American basketball player
Christian Bryant (born 1992), American football player
Christian Clemens (born 1991), German footballer
Christian Cooke (born 1987), English actor
Christian Corrêa Dionisio (born 1975), Brazilian football player
Christian Daniel, Puerto Rican singer-songwriter
Christian Danner (born 1958), German racing driver
Christian Darrisaw (born 1999), American football player
Christian DiLauro (born 1994), American football player
Christian Dior (1905–1957), French fashion designer
Christian Doppler (1803–1853), Austrian mathematician and physicist
Christian Ehrhoff (born 1982), German ice hockey player
Christian Elliss (born 1999), American football player
Christian Eriksen (born 1992), Danish professional footballer
Christian Fernández Salas, Spanish football player
Christian Fittipaldi (born 1971), Brazilian racing driver
Christian Fox (born 1981), Scottish footballer
Christian Friedrich (baseball) (born 1987), American baseball player
Christian Fuchs (born 1986), Austrian footballer
Christian Garcia (born 1985), American baseball player
Christian Gonzalez (born 2002), American football player
Christian Hackenberg (born 1995), American football player
Christian Hall (2001–2020), Asian-American man killed by police
Christian Harris (born 2001), American football player
Christian Heidel (born 1963), German football executive
Christian Holmes (born 1997), American football player
Christian Hosoi (born 1967), skateboarder
Christian Jessen (born 1977), English doctor and television presenter
Christian Johnson (born 1986), American football player
Christian Kern (born 1966), Austrian businessman and politician
Christian Kirk (born 1996), American football player
Christian Kum (born 1985), Dutch footballer
Christian Lacroix (born 1951), French fashion designer
Christian Latouche (born 1939/1940), French billionaire businessman
Christian Louboutin (born 1964), French footwear designer
Christian Jimenez (born 1986), American soccer player
Christian Julius de Meza, Danish army commander
Christian Kälin, Swiss lawyer and businessman
Christian Klien (born 1983), Austrian racing driver
Christian Koloko (born 2000), Cameroonian basketball player
Christian Laettner (born 1969), American basketball player
Christian Lindner (born 1971), German politician
Christian Lindner (born 1959), German journalist
Christian Maldini (born 1996), Italian footballer
Christian Matthew (born 1996), American football player
Christian McCaffrey (born 1996), American football player
Christian Miller (American football) (born 1996), American football player
Christian Navarro (born 1991), American actor 
Christian Okoye (born 1961), American football player
Christian Pampel (born 1979), German volleyball player
Christian Panucci (born 1973), Italian footballer
Christian Penigaud (born 1964), French beach volleyball player
Christian Ponder (born 1988), American football player
Christian Potenza (born 1972), Canadian actor
Christian Pulisic (born 1998), American footballer
Christian Quéré (1955–2006), French football player
Christian Redl (born 1948), German actor and musician
Christian Reiher (born 1984), German mathematician
Christian Riganò (born 1974), Italian footballer
Christian Rosenkreuz, legendary, possibly allegorical, founder of the Rosicrucian Order
Christian Rosenmeier (1874–1932), American politician
Christian Rozeboom (born 1997), American football player
Christian Sam (born 1996), American football player
Christian Scotland-Williamson (born 1993), American football player
Christian Siriano (born 1985), American fashion designer
Christian Sitepu (born 1986), Indonesian basketball player
Christian Slater (born 1969), American actor
Christian Tămaș (born 1964), Romanian writer and translator
Christian Taylor, American athlete
Christian Terlizzi (born 1979), Italian footballer
Christian Tessier (born 1978), Canadian actor
Christian Uphoff (born 1998), American football player
Christian Vasquez (born 1977), Filipino actor
Christian Vieri (born 1973), Italian footballer
Christian Villanueva (born 1991), Mexican professional baseball player
Christian von Koenigsegg (born 1972), Founder and CEO of Koenigsegg Automotive
Christian Wade (born 1991), British American football and rugby player
Christian Watson (born 1999), American football player
Christian Wilkins (born 1995), American football player
Christian Wirth (1885–1944), German Nazi SS concentration camp commander
Christian Wulff (born 1959), German politician
Christian Yelich (born 1991), American baseball player
Hans Christian Andersen (1805–1875), Danish author
 A ring name of Canadian wrestler Jay Reso

Females with the given name Christian
Christian Maclagan (1811–1901) Scottish Antiquarian
Christian Pitre (born 1983), Actress
Christian Ramsay (1786–1839), British botanist
Christian Serratos (born 1990), American actress

References

Norwegian masculine given names
French masculine given names
Swedish masculine given names
English masculine given names
German masculine given names
Danish masculine given names
Icelandic masculine given names
Irish masculine given names
Scottish masculine given names
Swiss masculine given names